Hubbells Corner is an unincorporated community in Dearborn County, Indiana, in the United States.

History
Hubbells Corner was named for Merritt Hubbell, a merchant.

References

Unincorporated communities in Dearborn County, Indiana
Unincorporated communities in Indiana